The Citadel of Dinant is a fortress located in the Walloon city of Dinant in the province of Namur, Belgium. The current fort was built in 1815 on a site which was originally fortified in 1051 when the region was ruled by the Prince-Bishopric of Liège. The citadel overlooks the city of Dinant and the strategic Meuse river which runs through the town. It is open to the public.

Together with Huy, Liège and Namur, the Citadel of Dinant forms part of the so-called Meuse Citadels.

References

External links

Official site

Dinant
World War I sites in Belgium
World War II sites in Belgium
 Dinant
Dinant